ArtHouse Live is a Maryland theater company based in Easton, Maryland which was formed in January 2006. Created by Brandon Hesson, Mark Mangold and Tim Weigand, the group performs contemporary theater. The group performs their shows at the Talbot County Historical Society Auditorium, a 250-seat theater in downtown Easton.

Biography
Hesson, Mangold and Weigand met at Mangold's father's pool hall, Easton Billiards, and started their own Public-access television show, What's Going On, with Erik Higgins in 1994. Mangold would later study film and television at New York University's Tisch School of the Arts, where he graduated from in 1998. In an attempt to raise money for his senior thesis, Mangold asked Weigand, Hesson and Higgins to help him produce a play as a fundraiser. The group formed Cricket Theatre and performed their first show, Sam Shepard's Fool For Love at the Avalon Theatre in 1998.

Cricket Theatre
Finding a niche in Easton's arts scene (the town would be named one of the Top 100 Small Arts Communities in America) Cricket Theatre went on to produce eleven shows at the Avalon from 1998 to 2003. Mangold directed most of the shows, with Weigand acting in the majority of them and Hesson in charge of the plays' production. The group produced plays from playwrights they deemed important to modern American theatre, including Shepard, Woody Allen, Beth Henley and Christopher Durang. They also performed the Tony and Pulitzer award winning contemporary plays Side Man by Warren Leight and How I Learned to Drive by Paula Vogel, and a community oriented production of A Christmas Carol. After Mangold left the group in 2003 to focus on his career in the music business, Weigand and Hesson reformed the group with other Cricket actors as Cricket Theater Company. The group would go on to produce two more new productions before folding for good in 2005.

ArtHouse Live
Hesson, Mangold and Weigand started anew in 2006 with ArtHouse Live Productions. Their first show was Craig Pospisil's Life is Short, which ran from April 6 to April 8, 2006. Their first season also included Eric Bogosian's Talk Radio and David Auburn's Proof. The group also participated in the National Film Challenge from Oct. 21-23, 2006. Produced by the highly recognized 48 Hour Film Project, the National Film Challenge asks teams to write, shoot and edit a six- to eight-minute film in one weekend. Their entry, titled "Closed Doors", is available for viewing on YouTube.

Initial Ensemble
ArtHouse Live announced their initial ensemble in 2007. Joining Mangold, Weigand and Hesson were Casey Stork, Michael Kafka, Kate Bernstein, Adrienne Shostak, Basil Tydings, Jeff Perry, Erik Higgins, Shiela Wainwright, Vin Brown, Jo Tanner Bantum and Jackie Kinney. Ensemble members are required to produce one credit per year in order to maintain their status.

Historical Society Auditorium
ArtHouse Live moved to the Historical Society Auditorium after performing in the Avalon Theatre for nearly nine years. The move was made to allow the group more rehearsal time in their performance space, as well as giving them the opportunity to perform their shows for more than one weekend. The group's 2007 fundraiser, featuring alt-country singer-songwriter Scott Miller took place on Feb. 3, 2007, and marked the group's first production in their new home.

2007 Season
The group's 2007 kicked off in March with their production of Eric Coble's "The Dead Guy." The performance earned rave reviews for incorporating a multi-media presentation that simultaneously broadcast the theatrical production live as a television show during the performance. The show starred Casey Stork, Annie Butler, Deb Downey, Michael Kafka, Jackie Whittington, Clay Owens, Lindley Bounds, Erik Higgins and Jeff Perry. The remainder of the season featured Jason Robert Brown's "The Last Five Years", David Mamet's Glengarry Glen Ross and Donald Marguiles' Brooklyn Boy.

External links 
 Official web site

Easton, Maryland
Performing groups established in 2006
Theatre companies in Maryland
2006 establishments in Maryland